The Parque de los Próceres is a park in Mayagüez, Puerto Rico.

In 1977 the mayor of Mayagüez, Don Benjamín Cole obtained a grant from the Economic Development Administration of the United States Department of Commerce for the construction of the "Parque de los Próceres Puertorriqueños".  The park is located in the banks of the Yagüez River between roads PR-108 and PR-65. The name of the park is Spanish for "Puerto Rican Patriots Park". It is located across the street from the Palacio de Recreación y Deportes.

The park's gardens are accentuated by commemorative plaques about prominent Puerto Ricans. It contains many paths appropriate for walks and bike riding, ornate gazebos and decorative ponds. Parque de los Próceres has been called "the lungs of the city of Mayagüez".

References

Parks and plazas in Mayagüez, Puerto Rico
Urban public parks